The Ryazan electoral district was a constituency created for the 1917 Russian Constituent Assembly election. The electoral district covered the Ryazan Governorate. Ryazan Governorate was a rural province, marked by history of serfdom and the struggles following the Emancipation reform of 1861. Socialist-Revolutionaries and Bolsheviks battled for hegemony over the peasantry and the distribution of lands.

There were 1,190,190 eligible voters in the constituency. The account of U.S. historian Oliver Henry Radkey, who is the source for the vote tally in the results table below, is missing the votes from Egoriev  (1 out of 12 uezds in the electoral district).

In Ryazan town the main party were the Constitutional Democrats, who mustered 6,430 votes (43.2%). The Bolsheviks obtained 3,841 votes (25.8%), the SRs 2,279 votes (15.3%), the Landowner-Old Believer list 1,121 votes (7.5%), Popular Socialists 612 votes (4.1%), Mensheviks 584 votes (3.9%) and the Group of Non-Party Voters 36 votes (0.2%). In the Ryazan garrison the Bolsheviks obtained 73.5% of the vote (2,929 votes).

Results

References

Electoral districts of the Russian Constituent Assembly election, 1917